The New Frontiers School Board (NFSB, CSNF) is an English-language school board in the province of Quebec. The school board was formerly known as the Chateauguay Valley English Protestant School Board until the Province of Quebec opted for linguistic, rather than Roman Catholic and Protestant, school boards. The new name was intended to reflect the regions that were initially placed under the oversight of the NFSB; however, the board's boundaries have since returned to their original scope.

The NFSB is responsible for anglophone public schools in southwestern Montérégie, most notably the towns of Châteauguay, Ormstown, and Huntingdon. The territory borders the United States to the south, Ontario to the west, the St. Lawrence River to the north, and Kahnawake to the east.

List of schools
This school board oversees 10 elementary schools, 2 secondary schools, and 3 adult and vocational centres, with over 4,800 students enrolled altogether.

Elementary schools
 Centennial Park Elementary School (Châteauguay, Quebec)
 Franklin Elementary School (Franklin Centre, Quebec)
 Gault Institute (Salaberry-de-Valleyfield, Quebec)
 Harmony Elementary School (Châteauguay, Quebec)
 Hemmingford Elementary School (Hemmingford, Quebec)
 Howick Elementary School (Howick, Quebec)
 Heritage (formerly the Academy and St. Joseph) (Huntingdon, Quebec)
 Mary Gardner Elementary School (Châteauguay, Quebec)
 Ormstown Elementary School (Ormstown, Quebec)
 St. Willibrord Elementary School (Châteauguay, Quebec)

High schools
 Chateauguay Valley Regional High School (Ormstown, Quebec)
 Howard S. Billings Regional High School (Châteauguay, Quebec)

Other schools
 Chateauguay Valley Career Education Centre (CVCEC) (Ormstown, Quebec)
 Nova Career Centre (Châteauguay, Quebec)
 Huntingdon Adult Education and Community Centre (HAECC) (Huntingdon, Quebec)

See also
Riverside School Board
Eastern Townships School Board

References

External links

Châteauguay
Education in Montérégie
School districts in Quebec
Quebec English School Boards Association